Facinet Keita (born 23 March 1984 in Conakry, Guinea) is a Guinean judoka who competed in the Men's 100+ kg category at the 2012 Summer Olympics in London. He lost to Ricardo Blas, Jr. in the first round. Keita was the flag bearer for Guinea at the opening ceremony.

References 

Guinean male judoka
1984 births
Living people
Olympic judoka of Guinea
Judoka at the 2012 Summer Olympics
Sportspeople from Conakry